William le Vavasour (died 1311), Lord of Hazelwood, was an English noble.

William was the eldest son of John le Vavasour and Alice Cockfield. He was active in the wars in Gascony and Scotland. He died in 1311 and was buried in the chapel of St. Leonard, Hazelwood.

Marriage and issue
He married Nicholea, daughter of Stephen Walleys, they are known to have had the following known issue:
William Vavasour
Robert Vavasour
Henry Vavasour

Citations

References

Year of birth unknown
1311 deaths
13th-century English people
14th-century English people